Mazen al-Hamada (born 1977) is a Syrian activist from Deir ez-Zor. Hamada was imprisoned and tortured for one and a half years for participating in anti-government protests in the context of the Arab Spring in 2011. After being exiled from Syria, he became an asylum seeker in the Netherlands where he publicly testified to the abuse he suffered. On February 23, 2020, Hamada became the victim of enforced disappearance, when he was arrested by Syrian intelligence. He has been missing since then.

Biography 
Hamada was a graduate of the Institute of the Petroleum Industry, and working as a technician for the French multinational oil and gas company Schlumberger.

He took part in demonstrations calling for more freedom and democracy, and decided to film these events with his phone. Hamada was arrested for the first time on April 24, 2011, by Syrian intelligence services. He was released a week later. After a second arrest on December 29, 2011, and two weeks of detention in the same branch, he decided to leave for Damascus.

Arrests, imprisonment, and torture 
In March 2012, Hamada attempted to smuggle 55 packages of baby formula to a suburb of Damascus. Soon after, Hamada and his two nephews were arrested. They were brought to the branch of the air force intelligence service of Mezzeh Military Airport. Hamada's two nephews would later die in detention.
Two weeks after the arrest, he was detained "in a small hangar, a little more than forty feet long and twenty feet wide" with 170 other prisoners.

Under torture, Hamada was forced to confess to being a terrorist, possessing weapons, and the murder of government soldiers. When he refused to confess, agents were called to come and torture him. He was beaten and suspended by the wrists. To alleviate his suffering, he agreed to sign a forced confession, admitting that he possessed a weapon to protect the demonstrators, but he refused to admit having committed any crimes. He was then transferred to another interrogation room, where he was undressed and sexually abused. After this torture he signed all of the documents.

At the beginning of 2013, he was ill and taken to military hospital 601, nicknamed by other detainees as a "slaughterhouse". In transit to the hospital, Hamada was physically assaulted. He was told to forget his name, and was assigned the number "1858". There he saw detainees tortured to death, corpses piling up in the toilets and hospital staff beating patients to death. Hamada begged the doctor to be returned to detention.

Back at Mezzeh airport he was treated for a month by a detained doctor, before being transferred to the Qaboun military police on June 1, 2013, and then to Adra Prison on June 5, 2013, where he remained for about two months. Mazen eventually was taken to the anti-terrorism court, which ordered his release 

During his imprisonment, which lasted 1 year and 7 months, Hamada was violently tortured. He suffered physical, mental, and sexual abuse. Mazen has permanent physical and psychological injuries from his detention in government prisons, including genital injuries that made having children impossible.

Exile 
After his release, Mazen al-Hamada was still wanted by the intelligence services. He therefore decided to leave Syria and asked for asylum in the Netherlands.

Return to Syria and forced disappearance 
Hamada decided to try to return to Syria. This decision was incomprehensible to his relatives and the people who have met him.

According to his friends and family, Hamada suffered a lot, both physically, from the consequences of torture and psychologically, both from not having a future and not being able to testify against the Syrian government in court. Hamada also was demoralized because he felt his many testimonies, interviews, and demonstrations had little effect for the people still detained in Syria. Hamada also had significant financial problems. Eventually Hamada cut himself off from friends, and felt that he could not find a therapist who seemed to understand what he had been through.

Hamada wanted to help the Syrians still detained, and he felt powerless to improve their situation. He seems to have been approached by people from the Syrian embassy, close to the Assad regime, and to have been lured back to Syria with promises of releasing detainees. Hamada wrote that he was ready to sacrifice himself to save others.

Hamada went to Berlin where he obtained a passport and visa from the embassy. Upon his arrival at Damascus airport on February 23, 2020, Hamada was apprehended by the regime's security services, and has been missing since.

See also
List of people who disappeared

References 

1977 births
2020s missing person cases
Enforced disappearances
Missing people
Missing person cases in Syria
People from Deir ez-Zor Governorate
Syrian dissidents
Syrian human rights activists
Syrian torture victims